Laure Touyé (born 12 May 1996) is a French rugby union player who plays for Montpellier and the France women's national rugby union team.

Career
Although she started training as a Judoka, and had not played rugby before the age of eighteen, Touyé stated that she grew to prefer the team sport nature of rugby, first for Blagnac SCR and then from 2019, Montpellier. She made her full France debut in November 2016 against the USA. She was named in France's team for the delayed 2021 Rugby World Cup in New Zealand. On 29 October, 2022 Touyé scored a second half try as France became the first team to reach the semi-finals with a 39-3 win over Italy.

References

1996 births
Living people
French female rugby union players